Nilson Evair Loyola Morales (born 26 October 1994) is a Peruvian footballer who plays for Sporting Cristal.

Club career
Loyola was born in Lima, and started his career as a forward with Sporting Cristal, joining their youth setup in 2004 at the age of ten. He left the club in 2013, after being converted to a left winger.

Loyola joined FBC Melgar in January 2014, initially appearing with the reserves. He made his first team debut on 22 February, starting in a 2–0 away win against Sport Huancayo for the year's Copa Inca.

After another match in the same tournament, Loyola would subsequently spend the rest of the year with the B-side, only returning to the main squad in a 1–1 Torneo Descentralizado home draw against Real Garcilaso, which ensured Melgar's Clausura title.

Loyola was definitely promoted to the main squad ahead of the 2016 season by manager Juan Reynoso, and became an undisputed starter for the side. He scored his first goal for the club on 18 May 2016, netting the equalizer in a 2–1 away loss against former side Sporting Cristal.

On 27 December 2018 Goiás announced the signing of Loyola.

International career
On 22 August 2016 Loyola was called up by Peru national team manager Ricardo Gareca for two 2018 FIFA World Cup qualification matches against Bolivia and Ecuador, but remained unused in both matches. He only made his international debut on 11 November, coming on as a second half substitute for Miguel Trauco in a 4–1 away routing of Paraguay.

On 16 November 2016, as Trauco was suspended, Loyola was handed his first start in a 2–0 home loss against Brazil.

In May 2018 he was named in Peru's provisional 24 man squad for the 2018 FIFA World Cup in Russia.

Career statistics

International
Statistics accurate as of match played 20 January 2022.

Honours
Melgar
Torneo Descentralizado: 2015

 Sporting Cristal

 Peruvian Primera División: 2020
 Copa Bicentenario: 2021
 Torneo Apertura: 2021
 Torneo Clausura runner-up: 2020

References

External links

1994 births
Living people
Footballers from Lima
Peruvian footballers
Association football fullbacks
Peruvian Primera División players
FBC Melgar footballers
Campeonato Brasileiro Série A players
Goiás Esporte Clube players
Sporting Cristal footballers
2018 FIFA World Cup players
Peru international footballers
Peruvian expatriate footballers
Peruvian expatriate sportspeople in Brazil
Expatriate footballers in Brazil